USS Mendota is a name used more than once by the U.S. Navy:

 , a sidewheel gunboat, was launched 13 January 1863.
 , a tugboat, formerly

References 

United States Navy ship names